Liposcelididae (historically often referred to as "Liposcelidae") is a family of booklice of the order Psocodea (formerly Psocoptera), belonging to the suborder Troctomorpha. Members of this family are small and flattened, and often wingless. Mesothorax and metathorax fused in wingless forms.

The family contains close to 200 species, arranged in nine genera which make up one smaller and one larger subfamily:

Subfamily Embidopsocinae
 Belapha
 Belaphopsocus
 Belaphotroctes
 Chaetotroctes
 Embidopsocopsis
 Embidopsocus
 Troctulus
Subfamily Liposcelidinae
 Liposcelis
 Troglotroctes
†Cretoscelis Grimaldi and Engel 2006 Burmese amber, Myanmar, Cenomanian

References

 
Psocoptera families
Nanopsocetae